Kashin (masculine) or Kashina (feminine) is a Russian surname. Notable people with the surname include:

Anna Kashina, Russian writer
Daniil Kashin (1769–1841), Russian composer
Kendo Kashin (born 1968), ring name of the Japanese wrestler Tokimitsu Ishizawa
Nikolay Kashin, Russian physician and discoverer of the Kashin-Beck Disease
Oleg Kashin (born 1980), Russian journalist and seaman

Russian-language surnames